Oak Grove is an unincorporated community in Washington Township, Starke County, in the U.S. state of Indiana.

Geography

References

Unincorporated communities in Starke County, Indiana
Unincorporated communities in Indiana